The Middleburg Historic District is a U.S. historic district located near Black Creek in Middleburg, Florida. Designated as such on March 9, 1990, the District encompasses 3881 through 3895 Main Street, 2145 Wharf Street, and 2125 Palmetto Street. The Middleburg Historic District contains five historic buildings:

 The Clark-Chalker House (on Main Street)
 Frosard W. Budington House (on Main Street)
 Haskell-Long House (on Main Street)
 George Randolph Frisbee Jr. House (on Palmetto Street)
 Edinfield House (on Wharf Street, formerly known as Thompson Street)

History

Federal Military Road (Coleraine, GA to Tampa Bay, FL)
In the 1830s, the Federal Military Road, of which Main Street was part, provided access to Fort Heileman during the Second Seminole War) and connected Garey's Ferry (the Historic District) to Whitesville (located approximately near the intersection of present-day Florida State Road 21 and County Road 218). Constructed between 1824 and 1827, the road ran south from Colerain, Georgia to Tampa, Florida. Intended to provide the area with military infrastructure and to increase development and settlement in the area, this was one of several federal roads in early Florida and should not be confused with the Bellamy Road or a separate federal road which ran from Pensacola to Saint Augustine, both of which were constructed in the same time frame.

American Civil War
On October 23, 1864, during the American Civil War, the 4th Massachusetts Volunteer Cavalry engaged local Confederates in a skirmish from their base at the Magnolia Springs hotel. Moving into Middleburg the next day, October 24, 1864, the 4th Massachusetts raided and set fire to downtown Middleburg on Main Street and Thompson (now Wharf) Street, destroying Samuel B. Thompson's cotton warehouses and docks, as well as a hotel. The 2nd Florida Cavalry, under command of Captain J.J. Dickison, retaliated by firing on the Massachusetts regiment, leading the latter to retreat across Black Creek and burn the ferry bridge behind them. As the Massachusetts regiment rushed back to Magnolia Springs, Dickison's regiment detoured four miles through Whitesville and caught the Massachusetts regiment at Jeremiah Halsey's Plantation, engaging in a skirmish that resulted in twelve Union deaths and Confederate victory. This skirmish is known officially as the Battle of Halsey's Plantation, but has also been referred to as the Battle of Big Gum Creek. The exact location of Halsey's Plantation is not known, but it was near the site that is currently Shadowlawn Elementary School on County Road 218.

Among the repeated skirmishes between the 4th Massachusetts and 2nd Florida cavalries was a two-hour engagement whereby Dickison's troops rescued cattle that had been seized by Union troops, which local history refers to as the Battle of the Tiger Head.

Other historic communities

Whitesville
Before Middleburg was consolidated into its current town limits, the area comprised two distinct settlements upon each prong of Black Creek, within miles of each other. Garey's Ferry, located upon the North Prong of Black Creek, was situated upon Main Street, near the site of the former Fort Heilman, and currently the site of the Main Street Boat Ramp, Memorial Park, and the physical Historic District.

Situated on the South Prong of Black Creek was the settlement of Whitesville (briefly called "Webster"), which was begun by Ozias Budington, and was located south of the intersection of SR21 (Blanding Blvd.) and CR218, in what is today the Black Creek Park North neighborhood. No buildings from the original Whitesville settlement remain, but the Budington cemetery is located on private land on Halperns Way, while other named streets in the community (e.g. Whitesville Landing Court, Budington Drive) allude to the village that once existed there.

Hill Top
Hill Top is another historic community located in Middleburg. The site of Middleburg's historic black community, Hill Top was first settled by homesteaders, including Grant Forman (1868-1951), in the 1890s. Today, the community is situated around Forman Circle, and includes churches, homes, and a one-room schoolhouse According to "Embedded in Clay," Forman fled to South Carolina after his house was burned by a white mob. Frosard Budington, a leader of Whitesville, covered the cost of Forman's land taxes until such time as it was safe for Forman to return to Hill Top.

Gallery of Historic Homes

References

External links
 Clay County listings at National Register of Historic Places

National Register of Historic Places in Clay County, Florida
Historic districts on the National Register of Historic Places in Florida